Silent Shout is the third studio album by Swedish electronic music duo the Knife, released on 17 February 2006 by Rabid Records. The album is darker than its predecessor, Deep Cuts (2003). It spawned four singles: "Silent Shout", "Marble House", "We Share Our Mothers' Health" and "Like a Pen".

The album, the music video for the title track and some of the press photos were inspired by the work of German-American animator Oskar Fischinger and the comic book series Black Hole by American cartoonist Charles Burns.

A three-disc deluxe edition of Silent Shout was released in Europe on 2 July 2007 and in the US on 17 July. In addition to the studio album, this package includes the DVD Silent Shout: An Audio Visual Experience (which contains the Knife's live concert in Gothenburg on 12 April 2006, as part of their Silent Shout tour, and all of the duo's music videos to date), as well as a CD of the concert's audio.

Music and composition
Silent Shout is a synth-pop and techno album.  The collaboration between Olof and Karin Dreijer was described by the French pop culture magazine Magic as Jay-Jay Johanson meets Siouxsie. Pitchfork viewed Karin's performance on the album as a "shrill voice (think Björk by way of Ari Up by way of Siouxsie Sioux by way of Mu's Mutsumi Kanamori)". Karin's multi-tracked vocals were frequently pitch-shifted to produce a "creepy result". The Austin Chronicle also said that sonically, the music merged "Siouxsie Sioux with Aphex Twin".

Critical reception

Silent Shout received generally positive reviews from music critics. At Metacritic, which assigns a normalised rating out of 100 to reviews from mainstream publications, the album received an average score of 74, based on 22 reviews. Pitchfork named it the best album of 2006 and the title track the second best song. The song was also listed at number 74 on the website's list of "The Top 500 Tracks of the 2000s", while the album was placed at number 15 on its list of "The Top 200 Albums of the 2000s". The album placed 15th in The Wires year-end critics' poll.

Resident Advisor named Silent Shout the second best album of 2006 and ninth best album of the 2000s decade. In 2009, the album was included at number five on Clashs "Essential 50" list. Silent Shout was placed at number 95 on Slant Magazines list of the best albums of the 2000s. musicOMH, when compiling its "21 Best Albums of the 2000s" list, placed the album at number seven. On their "50 Greatest Albums of the 2000s" feature, Gigwise placed the album at number seven, calling it "ground-breaking" and stating, "On the first spin it's baffling, second it's intriguing, but many listens in and you realize that Karin and  Dreijer have concocted a masterpiece of their genre."

The album was ranked number 83 on Pitchforks People's List, a readers' poll of the 200 best albums from Pitchforks first 15 years (1996–2011).

Commercial performance
As of January 2013, Silent Shout had sold 65,000 copies in the United States, according to Nielsen SoundScan. In October 2011, the album was awarded a gold certification from the Independent Music Companies Association (IMPALA), which indicated sales in excess of 75,000 copies throughout Europe.

Track listing

Deluxe edition

Personnel
Credits adapted from the liner notes of Silent Shout.

 The Knife – recording, programming, production, vocals, mixing
 Jay-Jay Johanson – vocals 
 Christoffer Berg – mixing 
 Pelle Gunnerfeldt – mixing 
 Henrik Jonsson – mastering
 Johan Toorell – artwork

Charts

Weekly charts

Year-end charts

Release history

References

2006 albums
The Knife albums
Mute Records albums
V2 Records albums